West Acre is a village and civil parish in the King's Lynn and West Norfolk district of the county of Norfolk, England.

All Saints' Church is a Grade I listed building. West Acre Theatre is a theatre, cinema and arts workshop created from a converted Primitive Methodist chapel. West Acre Priory of St Mary and All Saints was a  monastic house, founded c.1100 by the de Toni family; the ruined priory gatehouse is Grade I listed.

The village is on the Nar Valley Way pathway. West Acre is a parish of the Kings Lynn and West Norfolk district council, which is responsible for the most local services. Norfolk County Council is responsible for roads, some schools and social services. For Westminster elections the parish forms part of the North West Norfolk constituency, represented by James Wild (Conservative).

References

Villages in Norfolk
Civil parishes in Norfolk
King's Lynn and West Norfolk